Magrora is a town in Gwalior district in Madhya Pradesh. It is situated at a distance of about 5 km from Dabra town, on Gwalior-Jhansi Road,  in Gwalior district.

History 
Magrora fort was built by Maharaja Hamirjoodeo. Magrora state has been known for kind hearted rulers very popular amongst the public. Before the war with Mahadji Sindhia they were the rulers of Pichhore (Dabra).

Transport 
The nearest airport is Gwalior.

References 

 2. Ref Rani Pushpa Raje, Aradhna Raje, Shalini Raje, Sarahana Raje Angre, Shivani Raje 

History of Madhya Pradesh
Villages in Gwalior district